Leeds 13 were a year group of BA
(Fine Art) students
at the University of Leeds in the late 1990s.
Their four-year degree consisted of two parts, marked as equal halves: art theory/history and studio practice.
Students usually worked as individuals,
and in studio practice produced their own art projects to show at an end-of-year exhibition.
However, as third- and fourth-years,
the Leeds 13 year group worked on studio practice as an artist collective
producing two large-scale conceptual artworks
and unconventional exhibitions.

Going Places (1998)
challenged the media and public's preconceptions about
contemporary art and artists.
The group pretended to go on a week-long fun-in-the-sun Spanish holiday,
apparently paid for with money donated to mount a conventional exhibition, 
then said they had made art and the exhibition
out of themselves and their trip.
The holiday story fooled first a student newspaper
then regional and national media outlets,
whose responses to the work and the students were predictably negative.
A few days later, Leeds 13 revealed the truththe holiday was an elaborate hoax  
and the donations would be repaidhoping the
media and public would reconsider their initial responses.
This created a media frenzy and 
embarrassment for outlets who ran the story without checking it was true.
Leeds 13 presented the holiday simulation and response in the media as their project.

The Degree Show (1999) challenged the conventions of academic fine art end-of-year exhibitions. With their new-found notoriety, Leeds 13 obtained corporate sponsorship and borrowed around £1 million worth of work by other artists. Using the eclectic collection of artworks as conceptual props, the group put its effort into mounting a successful show. They said the exhibition was art in itself and presented it as their project. All the members of Leeds 13 graduated with first class degrees, and most continued working together until mid-2000.

In an artists's statement,
written as The Degree Show was being marked and later published in the 
The Times Higher Education Supplement, Leeds 13 explained that they were 
"... trying to counter the traditional notion of the artist as an individual creator of specific objects."
Instead they worked as a collective producing one-off events that resisted marketing.
Going Places has continued to attract interest as an example of 
pushing the boundary in contemporary art and a well-executed media hoax.

Going Places (1998)
All thirteen third-year fine art students, 
nine women and four men,
began the 19971998 academic year working as individuals.
Through weekly seminars with their tutor and artist Terry Atkinson, 
they formed a collective for studio practice later known as Leeds 13, 
according to a news release, attributed to Atkinson, on the project's website.

Concept
The brief for the end-of-year project was reported as "come up with something thought-provoking" 
by Martin Wainwright of The Guardian newspaper.
The group were interested in popular preconceptions around contemporary art
particularly the boundary between activities acceptable as art practice
and those that were not.
They decided to produce a conceptual work, with an activity not generally accepted as art,
and hoped the media would distribute news of the project to the public.
To be newsworthy it had to be controversial,
and the group would see the project as a success
if it started public debate on the nature of art.
They chose to simulate a week-long package holiday on the Spanish Costa del Sol.
The group would present the simulation and the media response to both
the supposed holiday and the actual hoax as their project Going Places.

Preparation
Adding to the controversy, the group would appear to misuse financial donations on the holiday. 
They applied to their students's union, Leeds University Union, for money to mount a conventional exhibition,
and were granted £1,126.
The only business sponsor identified by the media was the 
owner of an art shop in Leeds who gave £50.

The donations were not spent but deposited.

Evidence for the holiday included a performance art event, stories, props and suntans.
The group's supposed return from Spain would be staged at the local international airport
for an audience of invited guests.
Posing as tourism students making a film, they persuaded airport authorities
to simulate a flight from Málaga on the arrivals board then
let them exit the landside area of arrivals for the event.
A prelude in an art space would gather the audience and set the Spanish theme.
Having made arrangements for the event they turned to the supporting evidence.

The group would claim to have spent six days  
swimming, sunbathing, drinking and enjoying the nightlife
on the Mediterranean Sea coast.
They created a set of photographs supposedly taken on their holiday.
Beach shots were actually taken on the North Sea coast at Cayton Sands near Scarborough,
while pool shots were from a private open air swimming pool in Chapel Allerton, Leeds.
A blue lens filter gave the water and sky a Mediterranean look.
Other backdrops included bars in Leeds and a wall mural, that reminded the students of Gaudi, 
at an abandoned Spanish-themed nightclub in Cayton Bay.
In the week before the event, the group hid in their student accommodation.
Using a hired suntanning bed and fake tan, 
the art students built up a skin tone 
that they later critiqued as "... (perhaps a shade too orange)..."
Preparation for Going Places was complete.

Holiday and response
On the evening of 6 May, around 60 guests, 
including the group's tutor Atkinson and head of department Ken Hay,
arrived at East Street Studios in Leeds. 
They found recorded flamenco music playing and sangria to drink but no artwork or students.
Journalists had not been invited.
After half an hour,
an air hostess appeared and led the guests to a charter bus 
that took them to Leeds Bradford Airport. There they witnessed the apparent return of the suntanned students
who claimed they had been on holiday in Estepona 
(often misspelled Estrepona).
The students invited the guests to the bar, and after a couple of hours paid the bill
supposedly with the last of the donations.

The Going Places holiday story spread across campus to journalists on the Leeds Student newspaper that, 
on Friday 15 May,
ran the front-page headline "Con artists' Spanish rip-off" continued inside under
"And they call this art?"
Two days later, the story was picked up by the national Sunday Mirror newspaper.
Regional newspapers the Yorkshire Post and Yorkshire Evening Post 
followed on Monday.
On Tuesday 19 May, when the hoax was revealed, reports of the holiday story were already
in national morning newspapers including the Daily Express, The Daily Telegraph and 
The Guardian.

By taking turns sharing the holiday story and photographs with journalists,
members of the group had managed to get Going Places from a student newspaper to news outlets nationwide 
in four days.

News reports covered objections from the donors to apparent misuse of their money
and support for Going Places from the students and Atkinson who said 
"... an event like that is quite within the bounds of contemporary practice." and
"I don't think there is any problem classifying it as artgood or bad art might be another thing."
Some newspapers also ran opinion pieces on Going Places as art.
Leeds Student said it was neither creative nor original because
millions of people take package holidays every year.
Using the Going Places group and "sheep-pickler Damien Hirst" as examples,
the Yorkshire Evening Post condemned modern art practitioners as more skilled at self-promotion than making art objects.
Instead of Atkinson, The Daily Telegraph asked art critics for their opinion;
Brian Sewell dismissed Going Places,
while Richard Dorment said 
"This is not a good work of art. It seems to me on the edge of being a hoax and quite a good joke. 
I think the joke wins."

At this point, only the students, their associates and airport staff knew the holiday had not taken place.
Even Atkinson thought it had; he commented on the group's good fortune that their
return flight had arrived on time.

The students planned to reveal the truth in the next issue of Leeds Student on 5 June,
but, given the intense media interest and the possibility of exposure through fact checking,
they went early replacing the story of Going Places the holiday with the reality of Going Places the hoax.

Hoax and response
On Tuesday 19 May, a member of the group appeared on the 
BBC Radio 4 early morning news and current affairs programme Today 
to reveal the holiday was a simulation and the donations were still on deposit.
By that afternoon, the Yorkshire Evening Post had confirmed the hoax 
by checking the facts about the group's return with a manager at the airport.
The hoax gained more coverage than 
the holiday from both news and entertainment media. 

The group put forward a stereotype of lazy and irresponsible contemporary art students who spent other people's money on leisure claiming it was work.
As the holiday story confirmed popular preconceptions,
media outlets rushed to publish before their rivals instead of checking the story was actually true.
By revealing the hoaxthe money had not been spent and simulating the holiday had been a great deal of workthe students
hoped the public and media would reconsider their initial responses.
The group wrote 
"During our brief foray into the limelight, 
we have added greatly to the jollity of the nation."
They also adopted the name Leeds 13 from the national media;
a name "... calculated to suggest ironic overtones of terroristic notoriety." according to
art journalist Paul Glinkowski.

Going Places was described as masterly by head of department Ken Hay 
"They have got everyone taking about the very thingsthe nature of art and its relationship with lifethat lie at the heart of the course."
Art critic Adrian Searle wrote it was a fantastic work that played with preconceptions.
Artist and tutor John Stezaker and 
curator Ralph Rugoff both said the project was interesting art.
Germaine Greer wrote Going Places was a masterpiece of "... the only art that millennial culture recognises... marketing."
Publicist Max Clifford complimented the group's public relations skills.
However, art academics at other institutions said Going Places was not interesting beyond showing the mutual reliance of art and the media, and accused the group of further damaging the reputation of artists.
More accusations were to follow.

Leeds 13 repaid the grant,
but Leeds University Union decided the group's deceptions had
damaged the reputations of students and the union itself.
They demanded an apology for publication in Leeds Student.
The group refused so its members were banned from their students's union for life.

In contrast, a University of Leeds spokesman had earlier declined to condemn
the group when it appeared they had both spent the donations and been on holiday.

In mid-July, the members of Leeds 13 were all awarded first class for their third year, and according to a BBC News report
"Examiners praised them for challenging popular perceptions about how art is produced, taught and criticised."

In September, Leeds 13's place in art history,
as the latest example of artists using the media, was explored 
by Ralph Rugoff in Frieze magazine.
He wrote that Going Places was a "... perfectly executed double whammy."
that had provoked public debate on the nature of art although he doubted the results would be illuminating.
More interesting was Leeds 13, and contemporaries Decima Gallery, 
had gone further than their predecessors by making the media their principal artistic medium, and
in distributing their work the media had added new facets. Rugoff labelled both groups Neo-Publicists.

Leeds 13 ended 1998 with Going Places and its "media frenzy" in 
The Times Higher Education Supplement news highlights of the year.
In 1999, Leeds 13 were among over forty contributors to the Go Away: Artists and Travel exhibition at the
Royal College of Art Galleries, London which ran 17 April6 May.
It appears Going Places had arrived in a conventional art exhibition
without producing further publicity outputs for the group's bibliography.

The Degree Show (1999)
For their fourth and final year, Leeds 13 were joined by two new members.

Concept
The group were interested in the growing role of the private sector as art patrons and the idea that the significance of one artwork was in relation to that of others. With their new-found notoriety, they decided to mount a successful corporate-style exhibition using an eclectic collection of borrowed works by other artists as conceptual props. Leeds 13 would claim the exhibition was art in itself and present it as their project The Degree Show.

Preparation
The group arranged business sponsors including property developers Hammerson, who hosted the exhibition on the nineteenth floor of their twenty-storey West Riding House,
Leeds's tallest building.
They also borrowed works, by over 30 artists and valued at around £1 million,
in a wide range of forms: 
sculpture by Duchamp and Barbara Hepworth, bronze by Rodin and Henry Moore, 
paintings by David Shepard and Damian Hirst, 
collages by Kurt Schwitters, a poster by Jeff Koons, 
photographs by Jo Spence, the BANK fax-back service, video, audio, furniture and performance.

Leeds 13 hung or mounted, lit and secured the works. 
They also created written material including the catalogue, wall labels, advertising and website.
The borrowing continued in the introductory essay,
a literary collage of art writing,
that explained the concept with
"As Hugh McDiarmid said 'the greater the plagiarism the greater the work of art.' 
If we can accept this dissident posture we can take this exhibition as a work of art in itself."

Response
The Degree Show was open to the public 818 June 1999,
longer than the three-to-four days of a typical end-of-year exhibition.
Leeds 13's tutor and art historian Ben Read conceded that students normally showed their own work, 
but he asked "Have they made these works their own art?" before
concluding that the exhibition had stimulated debate on the nature of art. 

However, other responses to the exhibition as art in itself were negative.
Most media reports included a re-run of Going Places,
and some suggested The Degree Show was another hoax 
that included fake artwork or was a feint before the
students revealed their own art objects, neither of which was true.
As the students had not shown their work that year or the previous one,
questions were asked about what had they been doing apart from grabbing headlines;
one report anticipated careers in public relations.
Critic David Lee of Art Review magazine summed up with 
"They made a shrewd point last year by the way they hoodwinked the media and the art world, 
and maybe this year confirms the important point that the path to success in modern art is through notoriety. 
It sounds like a complete abrogation of responsibility as a degree show."
Only academia accepted the exhibition as art in itself.

In contrast, the response to The Degree Show as an exhibition was positive.
According to a local gallery owner, who lent works by Rodin and Henry Moore, the mounting of the show was excellent.
David Shepherd, who exhibited two paintings, said the variety of work made it a great opportunity for the viewing public
and Read noted The Degree Show had more visitors than any of the department's previous exhibitions.

The day after the show opened, the students were awarded six first class and eight upper second class degrees 
(one student did not complete the year).
However, the studio practice half of their marks, for The Degree Show, was only upper second.
Seven students appealed, claiming the examiners had rushed their deliberations due to industrial action.
Their appeal was successful, and all fourteen were awarded first class degrees.

After graduation (late 19992000)
The group's first project as graduates was a contribution to the
Henry Moore Foundation initiative A Christmas Pudding for Henry (1999)
a multi-disciplinary exploration of the city of Leeds,
where Moore began his career as a sculptor, which ran 18 November18 December 1999.
According to the group's website, 
"The Leeds 13 produced Floiner, a video work that documented a fictional Leeds based artist, and two artworks by the character: one produced by driving his car over a canvas and the second a cabinet full of personal belongings."
A Christmas Pudding for Henry is unique among Leeds 13 projects
because it produced conventional artwork, 
but again there were no publicity outputs for the group's bibliography. 

In March 2000, Leeds 13 appeared in the f.k.a.a. (formerly known as art) exhibition 
at The Wardrobe, Leeds.
They presented a collection of Going Places items 
each one wrapped and given an arbitrary price 
including a bikini top for £69.96, a Frisbee for £110, a pair of men's shorts for £80,000 and
the album of holiday photographs for £13 million.
The group originally said that Going Places had not produced works for market,
but by f.k.a.a. clothing and props from the project
had become art, apparently for sale.

By mid-2000, eleven members were working on what was,
according to the group's bibliography,
the last Leeds 13 project covered by the media:
promoting the Batofar cultural centre and restaurant 
in a repurposed lighthouse ship on the Seine, Paris.

Continuing response
In 2000, A BBC Introduction to Modern and Contemporary Art by art journalist Paul Glinkowski was published. 
Glinkowski wrote that Going Places was "... possibly the most outrageous game in British art history."
categorising the project as subversive along with others 
that challenged both the rules and the rulers of the art world.

Going Places was the first example in the Simulation section of
art critic John A. Walker's book Art in the Age of the Mass Media (3rd ed.) published in 2001.
Walker acknowledged the group had raised questions about whether their simulated holiday could be accepted as art, 
and if so whether it was interesting or not.
But he saw the project as a prank to pay back the media for their routinely barbed coverage of art.
Having mentioned The Degree Show in passing, 
Walker concluded by wondering whether the art students should have studied public relations or journalism instead.

In 2009, RTÉ Radio 1 aired Grand Art featuring a Leeds 13 member and 
revisiting Going Places as one of two performance artworks from the late 1990s 
that cost around £1,000.

The 2013 Reith Lecture Beating the Bounds, given by artist Grayson Perry on BBC Radio 4,
examined the idea that anything can be art.
Using Going Places as an example, 
Perry hoped the project was a parody of that idea. 

In 2022, Vice Media published How we conned the British press a
podcast on Going Places featuring two Leeds 13 members and Martin Wainwright, 
former northern editor of The Guardian, who covered the group's projects in Leeds.
According to Wainwright both the holiday story and hoax reality were entertaining 
and Going Places should be considered one of history's famous hoaxes.

References

External links
  contains newspaper clippings, including those distributed by the University of Leeds Press Office, and photographs (see All Files)
 Publicity Outputs, Leeds 13-Style the group's bibliography to 2009
 Going Places
 How We Conned the British Press Vice Media podcast on Going Places featuring two Leeds 13 members and Martin Wainwright, former northern editor of The Guardian, who covered the group's projects in Leeds
 The Degree Show

British artist groups and collectives
University of Leeds